Youthful Folly is a 1934 British drama film directed by Miles Mander and starring Irene Vanbrugh, Jane Carr and Mary Lawson. It was a quota quickie made at Shepperton Studios for release by Columbia Pictures. It portrays the love lives of the son of daughter of an aristocratic lady.

It is also known by the alternative title Intermezzo.

Cast
 Irene Vanbrugh as Lady Wilmington 
 Jane Carr as Ursula Wilmington 
 Mary Lawson as Susan Grierson 
 Grey Blake as Larry Wilmington 
 Arthur Chesney as Lord Wilmington 
 Eric Maturin as Tim Gierson 
 Fanny Wright as Mrs. Grierson 
 Betty Ann Davies   
 Merle Tottenham   
 Belle Chrystall    
 Kenneth Kove

References

Bibliography
Chibnall, Steve. Quota Quickies: The Birth of the British 'B' Film. British Film Institute, 2007.
Low, Rachael. Filmmaking in 1930s Britain. George Allen & Unwin, 1985.
Wood, Linda. British Films, 1927–1939. British Film Institute, 1986.

External links

1934 films
1934 romantic drama films
1930s English-language films
British romantic drama films
Films shot at Shepperton Studios
Films set in England
British films based on plays
Films directed by Miles Mander
British black-and-white films
Films set in London
1930s British films